Salvia pratensis, the meadow clary or meadow sage, is a species of flowering plant in the family Lamiaceae, native to Europe, western Asia and northern Africa. The Latin specific epithet pratensis means "of meadows", referring to its preferred habitat. It also grows in scrub edges and woodland borders.

Description
The stems have four edges and are clad in glandular and soft hairs. The flower stalks are typically branched, with four to six flowers in each verticil forming a lax spike. The small calyx is dark brown. The upper lip arches in a crescent shape and the lower lip is three-lobed with the central lobe larger than the lateral lobes. In the wild the corolla is usually bluish-violet. In cultivation, the flowers have a wide variety of colors, from rich violet and violet-blue to bluish white, and from pink to pure white. There are two long stamens protected by the upper corolla lip and the fruit is a four-chambered schizocarp.

Distribution and habitat
Salvia pratensis is native to Europe, western Asia and northern Africa where it grows in meadows, fields, banks and rough places. It has become naturalized in many parts of the United States, and is considered a noxious weed in the state of Washington. At one time it was banned from California because it was thought to have naturalized in three locations.

Cultivation
It is widely grown in horticulture, especially Salvia pratensis subsp. haematodes, which is prized by flower arrangers as a cut flower. Some botanists consider it a separate species, S. haematodes.

Named cultivars include:-
 'Atroviolacea', dark blue to violet
 'Baumgartenii', blue to violet
 'Mitsommer' ("Midsummer"), sky blue
 'Rosea', rose-pink to purple
 'Rubicunda', rose-red
 'Variegata', blue and sometimes white-tipped flowers.

AGM cultivars
The cultivar group Haematodes, and the cultivar 'Indigo' with violet blue flowers, have both gained the Royal Horticultural Society's Award of Garden Merit.

Uses
The name of the plant 'clary' is derived from 'clear-eye' and the plant seeds were formerly used as a paste to remove particles from the eyes and to reduce inflammation or redness. It was also used as a gargle for sore throats, and to clean teeth. It has also been used as a flavouring for beers and wines.

References

External links
 
 

pratensis
Least concern plants
Plants described in 1753
Taxa named by Carl Linnaeus